Hitha Chandrashekhar is an Indian actress who works in Kannada films. She rose to fame with 2017 film 1/4 Kg Preethi.

Career
Hitha completed an acting course from Roshan Taneja School of Acting in Mumbai before making her film debut in 2017 with 1/4 Kg Preethi opposite Vihan Gowda which became successful. In 2016, she participated in the reality television show Dancing Star where she won the title which was aired on Colors Kannada. Currently she is acting in Duniya 2 opposite Yogesh and Onthara Bannagalu starring Kiran Srinivas, Sonu Gowda, Prathap Narayan, Praveen Pugalia.

Personal life
Hitha was born to actors Sihi Kahi Chandru and Sihi Kahi Geetha in Bangalore. She has a younger sister. Hitha met actor Kiran Srinivas during the shoot of a film. The two got engaged in August 2019 before marrying on 2 December that year.

Filmography

Films

Short films

Television

References

External links
 

Living people
21st-century Indian actresses
Actresses from Bangalore
Actresses in Kannada cinema
Year of birth missing (living people)